Nandalike is a village in Karkala taluk in the Udupi District in Karnataka, India. It is approximately 16 km east of Padubidri and about 15 km from Karkala town.

Tulu and Konkani are the most widely spoken languages. Other languages spoken here include Kannada.

Notable people

 Muddana, Kannada poet and writer better known as Mahakavi ("Great Poet") or Mahakavi Muddana.
 Nandalike Balachandra Rao, a writer and bank employee from Mangalore.

References

Villages in Udupi district